New Palestine School was a historic school building located at New Palestine, Hancock County, Indiana.  It was built in 1920, and was a two-story, Classical Revival style brick building. An addition was constructed in 1943. It has been demolished.

It was listed on the National Register of Historic Places in 1991 and delisted in 1992.

References

Former National Register of Historic Places in Indiana
School buildings on the National Register of Historic Places in Indiana
Neoclassical architecture in Indiana
School buildings completed in 1920
Schools in Hancock County, Indiana
National Register of Historic Places in Hancock County, Indiana
1920 establishments in Indiana